The Tale of Despereaux is a 2008 action video game published by Brash Entertainment. It is based on the 2008 film of the same name, which itself is based on the 2003 novel of the same name. It was first released for Nintendo DS, Wii, and PlayStation 2. A few days later, the game was also released on Microsoft Windows.

While the Nintendo DS version of the game received positive reviews, the other versions were mostly rated negatively.

Gameplay 
The Tale of Despereaux is an action game with jump 'n' run elements in which players control a mouse named Despereaux through a total of 16 chapters. While the Wii, PlayStation 2 and PC versions of the game feature a real 3D environment, the DS version is a 2.5D sidescroller game in which players have to walk from the left to the right side of the screen. When touching water, the mouse drowns and respawns at the start of the level or, if activated, the last checkpoint. Players can hit enemies with a sword to kill them. If enemies attack the mouse, the player dies and also respawns. Depending on the enemy, it will take a certain number of hits to kill them. In all levels, three notes—a red, a green, and a blue one—can be found.

Development 
On August 19, 2008, video game publisher Brash Entertainment announced that a video game based on the film The Tale of Despereaux was in development. On December 2, 2008, the game was released for Nintendo DS, Wii, and PlayStation 2. On December 16 of the same year, the game was also released on Microsoft Windows. An Xbox 360 version of the game was also planned, but cancelled for unknown reasons.

Reception 

According to Metacritic, the Nintendo DS version of the game received "Generally Favorable Reviews". IGN rated the PlayStation 2 and Wii versions of the game with 1.9 out of 10 points, calling it "[...] a total disaster [...]", stating that it "[...] offered almost nothing redeeming during the six to seven hours it took to beat it". However, the Nintendo DS version received a positive review with 7.7 of 10 points by IGN, stating that the game is "A charming little platformer that's ideal for younger gamers".

References

External links 
Official website (archived) on Wayback Machine
The Tale of Despereaux on MobyGames
The Tale of Despereaux on playstation.com
The Tale of Despereaux on Giant Bomb
The Tale of Despereaux on IMDb

2008 video games
Action video games
Video games about mice and rats
Video games based on films
Nintendo DS games
PlayStation 2 games
Video games developed in the United States
Wii games
Windows games
Sensory Sweep Studios games
Single-player video games
The Fizz Factor games
Brash Entertainment games